Giuseppe Matarrese (3 June 1934 – 27 June 2020) was an Italian Roman Catholic bishop.

Matarrese was born in Italy and was ordained to the priesthood in 1959. He served as bishop of the Roman Catholic Suburbicarian Diocese of Frascati, Italy, from 1989 to 2009.

Matarrese died on 27 June 2020, aged 86.

Notes

1934 births
2020 deaths
20th-century Italian Roman Catholic bishops
21st-century Italian Roman Catholic bishops